The North West Company is a multinational Canadian  grocery and retail company which operates stores in Canada's western provinces and northern territories, as well as the US states of Alaska, Hawaii, and several other countries and US territories in Oceania and the Caribbean.

The company traces its history back to the North West Company, a fur trading business headquartered in the city of Montreal in British North America from  1779 to 1821. It was merged into the Hudson's Bay Company in 1821. The enterprise continued as the Fur Trade Department, and then the Northern Stores Division of Hudson's Bay Company. In 1987, the division was acquired by a group of investors and in the 1990s it was relaunched as The North West Company. It is now a publicly traded company and is composed mainly of the old HBC Northern Stores Division. The Alaska Commercial Company, which makes up The North West Company's Alaskan operations, traced its roots back to the Russian-American Company. Cost-U-Less, which operates in Hawaii, the South Pacific and the Caribbean, was acquired in 2007. In 2017, 76% of Roadtown Wholesale Trading Ltd, which operates in the British Virgin Islands was acquired.

Brief history

The French controlled much of what is now Canada in the early 1700s. As a result, their traders had a large fur trading network. After the conquest of New France by the British in 1763, French traders founded the North West Company and continued expanding their fur trade into the Canadian interior. The competition with the Hudson's Bay Company led to a massive environmental impact with numerous fur trade posts being built, the interior of Canada being explored, and the beaver population being exhausted. The fur trade created conflict which increased tensions between the British, French and Indigenous People.

Current operations

The North West Company's head office is located in Winnipeg, Manitoba, Canada, built partly on the site of Upper Fort Garry. This building used to serve as the head office of the Hudson's Bay Company. It also operates two offices in the United States cities of Anchorage, Alaska, and Boca Raton, Florida.

, the North West Company had 4,921 employees in Canada and 1,726 employees in its international operations in Alaska, the South Pacific, and the Caribbean. and was the largest employer of Indigenous People in the business sector.

The company operates stores under these banners:

Canadian operations
 Northern (122 stores) – Northern Ontario, Quebec, Alberta, Saskatchewan, Manitoba, Labrador, Nunavut, Northwest Territories, Yukon, 
 NorthMart (6 locations across Northern Canada, excluding Yukon and in Manitoba and Labrador) – Cross Bay, Manitoba; Iqaluit, Nunavut; Goose Bay, Labrador; and Hay River & Inuvik, Northwest Territories
 Quickstop (5 locations)
 Giant Tiger (31 locations in Western Canada; operated under franchise from Giant Tiger Ltd.)
 Valu Lots (1 location)
 Solo Market (1 location)
 North West Company Fur Marketing (2 locations)
 Crescent Multi Foods – distributor operating in Saskatchewan, Manitoba, and northern Ontario
 Inuit Art Marketing Service
 North Star Air – Cargo and Passenger airline based in Thunder Bay, Ontario 

International operations
 AC Value Center (30 stores in Alaska)
 Quickstop (3 stores in Alaska)
 CostULess (12 stores in American Samoa, Barbados, the Cayman Islands, Curacao, Fiji, Guam, Hawaii, Sint Maarten, and the US Virgin Islands)
 Pacific Alaska Wholesale – distributor based in Anchorage
 Roadtown Wholesale (8 stores in the British Virgin Islands)

We Financial 
We Financial is the financial services division that operates a series of automatic teller machines (ATM) in each store, and offers the We Credit Card and We Prepaid Visa (jointly with Peoples Card Services). The division also offers cheque cashing, tax services and operates 64 Canada Post Outlets.

Further reading

 Ahrens, Merv. Fort Lac La Pluie of the North West Company, 177?-1821. Fort Frances, Ontario: Fort Frances Times Ltd, 2006.

References

External links
CostULess Subdivision
The North West Company Parent company

Companies listed on the Toronto Stock Exchange
Fur trade
Supermarkets of Canada
Companies based in Winnipeg
Supermarkets of the United States
1987 establishments in Canada